Zanesville is a city in and the county seat of Muskingum County, Ohio, United States. Historically the state capital of Ohio from 1810 to 1812, Zanesville anchors the Zanesville micropolitan statistical area (population 86,183), and is part of the greater Columbus-Marion-Zanesville combined statistical area.

History 
Zanesville was named after Ebenezer Zane (1747–1811), who had blazed Zane's Trace, a pioneer trail from Wheeling, Virginia (now in West Virginia) to Maysville, Kentucky through present-day Ohio. In 1797, he remitted land as payment to his son-in-law, John McIntire (1759–1815), at the point where Zane's Trace met the Muskingum River. With the assistance of Zane, McIntire platted the town, opened an inn and ferry by 1799. In 1801, Zanesville was officially renamed, formerly Westbourne, the chosen name for the settlement by Zane.

From 1810 to 1812, the city was the second state capital of Ohio. The National Road courses through Zanesville as U.S. Route 40. The city grew quickly in the 1820s–1850s. The city and the city of Putnam (eastern side of Muskingum River) from the 1840s until the Civil War broke out was part of the 'Underground Railroad'. In excess of 5,000 Union soldiers, along with hundreds of townsfolk, were stationed in the Zanesville area to protect the city in 1863 during Morgan's Raid. 
Novelist Zane Grey, a descendant of the Zane family, was born in the city.

After the Civil War, the city grew in size and gained prominence in the State for manufacturing and textiles. The city was also notoriously known for its bootlegging activities in the Prohibition era. From the 1820s until the 1970s, Downtown Zanesville was the premiere economic center of the city with various factories, offices, small to large stores, many small/large hotels, over a dozen stage/movie theaters, nearly twenty churches, and nearby neighborhoods (inhabited mainly by persons of Irish or German ethnicity).

In 1872, Zanesville annexed the adjacent community of Putnam. It is now the Putnam Historic District of Zanesville.

The city was historically known as a center for pottery manufacturing; in the first half of the 20th century, more than a dozen potteries operated in the city and the surrounding areas.  Bolstered by ample local clay deposits and rivers, the area produced both art pottery and functional, utilitarian pottery. Notable pottery manufacturers that operated in the area included the S.A. Weller Pottery Company, J. B. Owens Pottery Company, Roseville Pottery Company, American Encaustic Tiling Company, and the Mosaic Tile Company. The city peaked economically in the 1950s, and like many cities experienced a post-industrial decline. The city today has a relatively high level of chronic poverty and unemployment and a relatively low level of labor force participation and educational attainment. 

Since the 1970s, the downtown has been on the decline with mainly banks, law offices, churches and small shops, but the city continues to work on its image and business potential.

Geography 
Zanesville is located along the Muskingum River at its confluence with the Licking River.

The area has important deposits of clay which were exploited by a number of pottery companies in the first half of the twentieth century, including Roseville pottery, Weller pottery, the J. B. Owens Pottery Company, the Zanesville Stoneware Company, the Mosaic Tile Company, the American Encaustic Tiling Company, and the T.B. Townsend Brick Yard under the ownership of T.B. Townsend.

Climate

Demographics 

In the 1950s, Zanesville was known for its population of light-skinned Blacks who could "pass" (be admitted to whites-only places). This characteristic was due to a history of racial intermixing dating back to the role of Zanesville as a stop on the Underground Railroad.

2010 census
As of the census of 2010, there were 25,487 people, 10,864 households, and 6,176 families residing in the city. The racial makeup of the city was 84.4% White, 9.7% African American, 0.4% Native American, 0.4% Asian, 0.4% from other races, and 4.7% from two or more races. Hispanic or Latino of any race were 1.2% of the population.

There were 10,864 households, of which 31.3% had children under the age of 18 living with them, 32.1% were married couples living together, 19.1% had a female householder with no husband present, 5.7% had a male householder with no wife present, and 43.2% were non-families. 36.2% of all households were made up of individuals, and 14.9% had someone living alone who was 65 years of age or older. The average household size was 2.29 and the average family size was 2.97.

The median age in the city was 36.3 years. 25.1% of residents were under the age of 18; 9.8% were between the ages of 18 and 24; 25.6% were from 25 to 44; 24.5% were from 45 to 64; and 15.2% were 65 years of age or older. The gender makeup of the city was 46.6% male and 53.4% female.

2000 census
As of the census of 2000, there were 25,586 people, 10,572 households, and 6,438 families residing in the city.  The population density was 2,276.8 people per square mile (878.9/km2). There were 11,662 housing units at an average density of 1,037.8 per square mile (400.6/km2). The racial makeup of the city was 85.48% White, 10.76% African American, 0.40% Native American, 0.23% Asian, 0.02% Pacific Islander, 0.42% from other races, and 2.70% from two or more races. Hispanic or Latino of any race were 0.79% of the population.

There were 10,572 households, out of which 30.7% had children under the age of 18 living with them, 38.5% were married couples living together, 18.0% had a female householder with no husband present, and 39.1% were non-families. 33.4% of all households were made up of individuals, and 14.5% had someone living alone who was 65 years of age or older. The average household size was 2.36 and the average family size was 2.99.

In the city, the population was spread out, with 26.8% under the age of 18, 9.5% from 18 to 24, 27.8% from 25 to 44, 20.5% from 45 to 64, and 15.5% who were 65 years of age or older. The median age was 35 years. For every 100 females, there were 85.3 males. For every 100 females age 18 and over, there were 79.3 males.

The median income for a household in the city was $26,642, and the median income for a family was $31,932. Males had a median income of $27,902 versus $20,142 for females. The per capita income for the city was $15,192. About 19.3% of families and 22.4% of the population were below the poverty line, including 32.3% of those under age 18 and 14.8% of those age 65 or over.

Arts and culture

Attractions

A three-way bridge called the "Y-Bridge" spans the confluence of the Licking and the Muskingum rivers.  Listed on the National Register of Historic Places, it is one of few bridges of its type in the United States. Its unique shape led pilot Amelia Earhart to describe Zanesville as "the most recognizable city in the country". It has been rebuilt numerous times since the 1850s.

The Muskingum River Canal was designated a National Historic Civil Engineering Landmark.

Erected in 1874, the Muskingum County Courthouse is located in Zanesville on US Route 40, the National Road and Main Street. The bell in the courthouse was manufactured by the same company that made the Liberty Bell.

Lock #10 in downtown Zanesville features a "double lock".  The Muskingum River Parkway and its 160-year-old navigation system were designated a National Historic Civil Engineering Landmark by the American Society of Civil Engineers.

A colony of artists are located throughout downtown Zanesville; two galleries opened on Main Street in 2007.

Outdoor art includes murals depicting local heritage and honoring war veterans. One mural is a panorama of downtown with an emphasis on the Y-Bridge. The John McIntire Library has an outdoor rubbing wall that tells the history of Zanesville and Muskingum County, using ceramic tiles with historical inserts.

The Freight Shops on Market Street are restaurants and retail stores located within abandoned railroad structures.
  
Secrest Auditorium is a performance venue.

Zanesville is served by the Muskingum County Library System.  The library includes the Muskingum County Historical Society's records.

Government 
The city government is a Mayor/Council (10 members) elected form of government.  Zanesville Police Department was formed in 1865 with 6 officers. Today the department has over 55 officers and 40 more support staff.  The City Fire Department became fully paid staff in 1879. This department today has over 45 members working 24 on & 48 hours off, staffing 3 stations.

Education

Schools 
 The first school house (a log cabin) was built and opened in Zanesville in 1803. Zanesville High School is the high school for the Zanesville City Schools.
 Most students living within Zanesville city limits attend Zanesville City Schools, however students with Zanesville addresses but living outside of the city limits may attend Tri-Valley High School, John Glenn High School, West Muskingum High School, Maysville High School, and Philo High School.
 There are two private high schools—Bishop Rosecrans High School (Roman Catholic) and Zanesville Christian School.

Colleges 
 Ohio University-Zanesville (OUZ) is a branch campus of Ohio University.  The branch was in the high school building from 1946 until the current campus opened in 1969.
 Zane State College, formerly known as Muskingum Area Technical College, is adjacent to OUZ founded in 1969.
 Muskingum University is located in nearby New Concord.

Infrastructure

Transportation 

The city is served by Zanesville Municipal Airport, built during World War II, and opened near the end. It has two  runways. The airport had commercial flights from the late 1940s until the early 1970s.

The city is also served by several railroad lines.

Interstate 70 and U.S. Route 40 (which closely follows the path of the older National Road), pass through Zanesville and run roughly parallel to each other. From the southwest, US 22 approaches from Cincinnati. North-south state highways 60 and 93 pass through Zanesville.  Other state routes include 666, 555, 719, and 146.

Hospital
In 2016, the Good Samaritan campus and the Bethesda campus merged to form Genesis Hospital. The Good Samaritan campus was closed and demolished.

Notable people

 Kurt Abbott, major league baseball player
 Troy Balderson, United States Representative
 Richard Basehart, actor, narrator of closing ceremonies for 1984 Summer Olympics
 David F. Bice, retired inspector general of the United States Marine Corps
 Thomas Townsend Brown, inventor working on a purported anti-gravity devices and part-time researcher in unidentified flying objects
 Elwood Bruner, Alaska territorial and California state legislator
 Catharinus P. Buckingham, American Civil War general in the Union Army
 Una Mae Carlisle, jazz singer, pianist, songwriter
Duncan Convers, Episcopal priest and author
 Samuel S. Cox, U.S. Congressman and U.S. Ambassador to the Ottoman Empire
 Anne Virginia Culbertson, writer
Mark Dantonio, football head coach at Michigan State University
 James M. Gaylord, U.S. Representative from Ohio
 Cass Gilbert, architect
 Charles Champion Gilbert, Union army general
 David Graf (1950–2001), actor
 Robert S. Granger, Union army general
 Zane Grey, best-selling author, film pioneer
 Harry P. Guy, ragtime-era composer
 Otis Harlan, actor
Ella Hattan, fencer known as "La Jaguarina"
 Charles E. Hazlett, Union lieutenant and notable participant at Gettysburg
 Gladden James, actor
 Clarence Jones, professional baseball player
 Richard Kelly, pioneer of architectural lighting design.
 Sister Mary Aquinas Kinskey, OSF, teacher and aviator, born in Zanesville
 Mortimer D. Leggett, Union army general and superintendent of Zanesville schools
 Kevin Martin, professional basketball player
 Ralph D. Mershon, electrical engineer and OSU benefactor
 Hal Naragon, professional baseball player
 Nightbirde, American singer-songwriter
 Sy Oliver, jazz trumpeter, grew up in Zanesville
 Dan Patrick, radio personality, TV sportscaster
 Jay Payton, major league baseball player
Petra Pinn, nurse, hospital administrator
 Frederick Hurten Rhead, potter
 Addison Richards. Actor - Born 1902 in Zanesville
 Kim Richey, singer/songwriter, born 1956
 Ted Ross, Actor
 Randy Savage, Pro Wrestler, raised in Zanesville OH and attended middle school there.
 Thomas Shelton, Southern Gospel musician
 Chad Stewart, rock drummer 
 Fred R. Taylor, basketball coach
 Daniel Van Voorhis, United States Army Lieutenant General
 William Frederick "Whitey" Wietelmann (1919–2002), Major League Baseball player
 Jesse Yarnell, founded Los Angeles Mirror newspaper

In popular culture
Lorena was a campfire song during the American Civil War. The song was based on an ill-advised love affair that took place in Zanesville in the late 1850s. The song has been sung in many Westerns and Civil War movies, and John Ford used the song as background in some movies.

See also
2011 Zanesville, Ohio animal escape

References

External links

 City website
  Zanesville-Muskingum County Chamber of Commerce

 
1797 establishments in the Northwest Territory
Cities in Muskingum County, Ohio
Cities in Ohio
County seats in Ohio
Ohio
Muskingum River
National Road
Populated places established in 1797